Josef Deutsch (26 March 1895 – 1984) was an Austrian footballer. He played in three matches for the Austria national football team from 1916 to 1919.

References

External links
 
 

1895 births
1984 deaths
Austrian footballers
Austria international footballers
Place of birth missing
Association football defenders
Floridsdorfer AC players